The 2011 All-Ireland Senior Hurling Championship was the 123rd staging of the All-Ireland championship since its establishment by the Gaelic Athletic Association in 1887.  The draw for the 2011 fixtures took place on 7 October 2010. The championship began on 14 May and ended on 4 September 2011. Tipperary were the defending champions.

Kilkenny secured the title with a 2-17 to 1-16 defeat of Tipperary in the All-Ireland final.  This was their 33rd All-Ireland title, their eighth in twelve championship seasons.

Teams
A total of fourteen teams will contest the championship, including thirteen teams from the 2010 championship and one promoted team from the 2010 Christy Ring Cup.

Laois, Carlow and Wexford were the first teams to exit the 2010 championship; however, there was no relegation play-off. They would all contest the 2011 championship.

2010 Christy Ring Cup champions Westmeath secured direct promotion to the championship. The team made their top flight return after being relegated at the end of the 2006 championship.

Team summaries

Stadia and locations

Personnel and kits

Managerial changes

The Championship

Format
The All-Ireland Senior Hurling Championship of 2011 will be run on a provincial basis as usual.  It will be a knockout tournament with pairings drawn at random in the respective provinces - there will be no seeds.

Each match will be played as a single leg. If a match is drawn there will be a replay.  If that match ends in a draw a period of extra time will be played, however, if both sides are still level at the end of extra time another replay will take place.

Munster Championship

Quarter-final: (1 match) This will be a single match between the first two teams drawn from the province of Munster.  The losing team enters the All-Ireland qualifiers while the winners advance to the semi-finals.

Semi-finals: (2 matches) The winner of the lone quarter-final joins the other three Munster teams to make up the semi-final pairings.  The two winning teams advance to the final while the two losing teams enter the All-Ireland qualifiers.

Final: (1 match) The winners of the two semi-finals contest this game.  The winning team advances to the All-Ireland semi-final while the losing team advances to the All-Ireland quarter-final.

Leinster Championship

Preliminary Round: (2 matches) These will be two matches between four of the 'weaker' teams from the province.  The two winning teams advance to the quarter-finals while the two losing teams enter the All-Ireland qualifiers.

Quarter-finals: (3 matches) The winners of the two preliminary round games join the other four Leinster teams to make up three quarter-final pairings.  The three winning teams advance to the semi-finals while the three losing teams enter the All-Ireland qualifiers.

Semi-finals: (2 matches) The three winners of the quarter-finals join Kilkenny (who will receive a bye to this stage) to make up the semi-final pairings.  The two winning teams advance to the final while the two losing teams enter the All-Ireland qualifiers.

Final: (1 match) The winners of the two semi-finals contest this game.  The winning team advances to the All-Ireland semi-final while the losing team advances to the All-Ireland quarter-final.

Leinster Senior Hurling Championship

Munster Senior Hurling Championship

All-Ireland Qualifiers

Preliminary round

Phase 1

Phase 2

Phase 3

All-Ireland Senior hurling Championship

Quarter-finals

Semi-finals

Final

Statistics

Scoring
First goal of the championship: Simon McCrory for Antrim against Laois (Leinster preliminary round, 14 May 2011)
Fastest goal of the season: 20 seconds – Paudie O'Sullivan for Cork against Galway (All-Ireland qualifiers phase 3, 9 July 2011)
Widest winning margin: 34 points 
Cork 10-20 : Laois 1-13 (All-Ireland qualifiers preliminary round, 18 June 2011)
Most goals in a match: 11 
Cork 10-20 : Laois 1-13 (All-Ireland qualifiers preliminary round, 18 June 2011)
Most points in a match: 45 
Tipperary 3-22 : Cork 0-23 (Munster quarter-final, 29 May 2011)
Galway 4-25 : Clare 0-20 (All-Ireland qualifiers phase 2, 2 July 2011)
Most goals by one team in a match: 10 
Cork 10-20 : Laois 1-13 (All-Ireland qualifiers preliminary round, 18 June 2011)
Most goals scored by a losing team: 3 
Waterford 3-15 : Limerick 3-14 (Munster semi-final, 12 June 2011)
Antrim 1-21 : Laois 3-12 (Leinster quarter-final, 14 May 2011)
Most points scored by a losing team: 23 
Tipperary 3-22 : Cork 0-23 (Munster quarter-final, 29 May 2011)

Top scorers
Overall

Single game

Hat-tricks

Four goals in a game

Discipline
 First yellow card of the championship: John A. Delaney for Laois against Antrim, 39 minutes (14 May 2011)
 First red card of the championship: Neil McAuley for Antrim against Laois, 40 minutes (14 May 2011)

Miscellaneous
 Antrim's defeat of Laois in the preliminary round of the Leinster championship is the team's first ever victory in the provincial series of games.
 The Munster quarter-final meeting of Cork and Tipperary sets a new record as the eighth consecutive year that the sides have met in championship hurling.  Previous consecutive meetings stretched from 1949 (draw and replay) to 1954 – a total of seven games in six years.  Earlier, eight games were played in the seven-year period 1907 to 1913, however, two of those games were played in the calendar year of 1908.
 The Leinster semi-final meeting between Wexford and Kilkenny at Wexford Park is the first championship meeting between the two sides at that venue since the 1944 Leinster semi-final.
 The All-Ireland qualifiers preliminary round meeting between Antrim and Westmeath is the first ever championship meeting between the two sides.
 The All-Ireland qualifiers preliminary round meeting between Laois and Cork is the first championship meeting between the two sides since the 1915 All-Ireland final.  Laois are the only team that Cork have played but never beaten in the championship.
 Cork's total of 10-20 against Laois in the preliminary round of the qualifiers is the first time that a side has scored ten goals in the championship since Offaly defeated Westmeath by 10-9 to 2-6 in the 1966 Leinster first round.
 The Leinster semi-final meeting of Galway and Dublin is not only both sides first meeting in the provincial championship but is also the first meeting of the two sides since the 1941 All-Ireland semi-final.
 Dublin preserve their 100% championship record over Galway with a victory in the Leinster semi-final.  Previous victories came in the 1924 All-Ireland final and the 1941 All-Ireland semi-final
 Lar Corbett becomes Tipperary's all-time leading championship goalscorer when he scores his 21st goal against Clare in the Munster semi-final.
 For the first time in history Dublin qualify for the provincial minor, under-21 and senior finals in the same year.
 Kilkenny's defeat of Dublin in the Leinster final is their seventh consecutive provincial title and sets a new record. Kilkenny also held the previous record of six-in-a-row between 1998 and 2003.
 Henry Shefflin's goal in the Leinster final made him the only player in history to score a goal in thirteen consecutive championship seasons.
 Tipperary's 7-19 to 0-19 defeat of Waterford is the biggest margin of victory in a Munster final since Cork beat Waterford by 5-31 to 3-6 in the 1982 provincial decider.  The 21-point winning margin is joint ninth in the top ten biggest Munster final victories.
 The last time a team scored seven or more goals in a Munster final was in 1936 when Limerick defeated Tipperary by 8-5 to 4-6. Mick Mackey scored 5-3 of their total.
 Brendan Cummins equalled Christy Ring's all-time championship appearances record, joining Ring on 65 appearances for Tipperary in the Munster Final.
 Tony Browne of Waterford becomes the fourth player to achieve at least 60 championship appearances with his appearance against Galway in the All-Ireland quarter-final.
 Dublin's defeat of Limerick in the All-Ireland quarter-final is their first ever championship victory over the Munster team. As a result of this, Dublin reach the All-Ireland semi-final for the first time since 1948.
 Waterford preserve their 100% championship record over Galway with a victory in the All-Ireland quarter-final.  They have now beaten the westerners on ten occasions on the championship.
 The All-Ireland semi-final between Kilkenny and Waterford is delayed by fifteen minutes due to the playing of extra time in the All-Ireland minor semi-final between Clare and Galway.
 Kilkenny become the first team ever to reach six consecutive All-Ireland finals.
 Tipperary's Brendan Cummins lines out for the 65th time in championship hurling to become the most "capped" player of all-time in the All-Ireland semi-final against Dublin. After equalling Christy Ring's long-held record in the Munster final he betters it in this game.
 The All-Ireland final between Kilkenny and Tipperary is the third year in-a-row that the sides meet in the championship decider.  This is the first time that this has happened since 1903, when Cork and London met in the All-Ireland final for the third consecutive year.
 As a result of Kilkenny's All-Ireland final defeat of Tipperary, Henry Shefflin and Eddie Brennan join Christy Ring and John Doyle as holders of a record eight All-Ireland medals.

Player facts
Debutantes
The following players made their début in the 2011 championship:

Retirees
The following players played their last game in the 2011 championship:

Media coverage
The 2011 All-Ireland Senior Hurling Championship was covered extensively in Ireland by RTÉ Television, RTÉ Radio and RTÉ.ie, with coverage of 31 live games across both the All-Ireland Football and Hurling Championships, with Michael Lyster presenting the live coverage. The Sunday Game presented by Des Cahill covered extended highlights and analysis of the day's games on a Sunday night. Live games, on demand re-runs and match highlights were also carried on the RTÉ website. TV3 also broadcast a selection of All-Ireland Senior Football Championship and All-Ireland Senior Hurling Championship matches, as well as a weekly preview show called The GAA Show which aired on a Friday evening during the championship.

References

2011 in hurling